Abu al-Hasan 'Ali (died c. 1009) was ruler of Khwarazm (a large oasis region on the Amu Darya river delta in western Central Asia) from 997 until his death c. 1009. The second member of the Ma'munid dynasty, he was the son of Ma'mun I ibn Muhammad.

In 997, Ali took over Khwarazm following his father's death. Little is known of his reign, but his emirate was dependent upon the Karakhanids, rivals of the Ghaznavids. He died around 1009 and was succeeded by his brother, Abu al-Abbas Ma'mun.

References

Sources 
 

1009 deaths
Year of birth unknown
11th-century Iranian people
10th-century Iranian people
Ma'munids